This is a list of episodes of the 2008 Japanese animated television series True Tears. The episodes are directed by Junji Nishimura and produced by P.A. Works, Lantis, and Bandai Visual. P.A. Works produced the animation and Lantis was responsible for the production of the music. The anime, while sharing its title with the visual novel by La'cryma, has no relation to the visual novel; however, La'cryma is credited as the series' original creator. The story follows Shin'ichirō Nakagami, a high school student, who is unable to express his feelings for Hiromi Yuasa, a fellow high school student who was taken in by Shin'ichirō's parents after her father died, as well as his interactions with another student, Noe Isurugi, who enlists Shin'ichirō's aid in recovering her "tears."

The episodes aired from January 6, 2008 to March 29, 2008 on TV Kanagawa in Japan, although a special preview of the first episode was shown in Japan on January 4, 2008 on BS11 Digital. The episodes also aired at later dates on Chiba TV, Kansai TV, Kids Station, Tokai TV, TV Saitama, and BS11 Digital. The title for a given episode is a line spoken within the episode.

Two pieces of theme music are used for the episodes; one opening theme and one ending theme. A single for "Reflectier" was released on January 23, 2008, and a single for "Sekai no Namida" was released on February 6, 2008.

A DVD compilation, containing the first two episodes of the anime, was released by Bandai Visual on March 25, 2008. Four more DVD compilations, each containing two episodes, have been announced for release between April 25, 2008, and July 25, 2008 respectively.

Episode list

See also

List of anime based on video games

References
General

Specific

External links
Official website 

True Tears